Joo Ki-Hwan (Hangul: 주기환; born December 20, 1981) is a South Korean footballer (defender) playing currently for PSPS Pekanbaru.

References

External links

Joo Ki-Hwan at liga-indonesia.co.id
 

1981 births
Living people
South Korean footballers
South Korean expatriate footballers
Association football defenders
Geylang International FC players
PSM Makassar players
PSPS Pekanbaru players
Liga 1 (Indonesia) players
Singapore Premier League players
Expatriate footballers in Indonesia
South Korean expatriate sportspeople in Indonesia
Expatriate footballers in Singapore
South Korean expatriate sportspeople in Singapore